Ralf Karel Hubert Krewinkel (born 12 November 1974 in Kerkrade) is a Dutch politician of the Labour Party (Partij van de Arbeid). Since 31 August 2015 he has been mayor of Heerlen.

From 1 May 2011 till summer 2015 he was mayor of the Limburg municipality Beek. Previously he was a member of the city council of Kerkrade from 1998 to 2006 and an alderman of the same municipality from 2006 till 1 May 2011.

References 
  Ralf Krewinkel nieuwe burgemeester Beek, Rijksoverheid.nl, March 25, 2011
  Benoeming burgemeester Heerlen, Rijksoverheid.nl, July 3, 2015

1974 births
Living people
Aldermen in Limburg (Netherlands)
Labour Party (Netherlands) politicians
Mayors in Limburg (Netherlands)
Mayors of Heerlen
People from Beek
People from Kerkrade